Azerbaijani football in 2013

Azerbaijan Premier League

Championship group

Relegation group

Azerbaijan First Division

Azerbaijan Cup

National team

Goal scorers

Azerbaijani clubs in Europe

UEFA Champions League

Second qualifying round

Third qualifying round

UEFA Europa League

First qualifying round

Second qualifying round

Play-off round

Group stage

Group H